Nino Louarsabishvili (born 3 February 1977) is a retired Georgian female tennis player.

She won six singles and seven doubles titles on the ITF circuit in her career. On 24 April 1995, she reached her best singles ranking of world number 135. On 21 July 1997, she peaked at number 111 in the doubles rankings.

Playing for Georgia at the Fed Cup, Louarsabishvili has a win–loss record of 17–23.
Louarsabishvili retired from professional tennis 2000.

ITF finals

Singles (6–3)

Doubles (7–6)

References

External links
 
 
 

1977 births
Living people
Female tennis players from Georgia (country)